Curious George 2: Follow That Monkey! is a 2009 American animated comedy film based on the children's stories by H.A. Rey and Margret Rey. It is a sequel to the 2006 film Curious George. It was originally titled Curious George 2: Monkey on the Run. It was released straight to DVD in the United States and theatrically in Denmark, Sweden, and Iceland.

While Frank Welker and Ed O'Ross reprise their roles from the first film as George and Ivan respectively, several other roles were recast. Will Ferrell, the voice of Ted (The Man with the Yellow Hat), was replaced by Jeff Bennett, reprising his role from the television series; Drew Barrymore, the voice of Maggie, was replaced by Nickie Bryar; Dick Van Dyke, the voice of Mr. Bloomsberry, was replaced by Fred Tatasciore. Clint Howard voices Balloon Man in the first film, but in the sequel, voices Farmer Dan. Tim Curry, Jamie Kennedy, Matt Lauer, and Jerry Lewis voice the new characters. Ron Howard, who is the producer of the 2006 film, returns as executive producer, along with his partner Brian Grazer.

Plot
  
Taking place after the events of the first film, George, who is now living with Ted in his apartment in New York City, find the morning newspaper that the magician Piccadilly is putting on an act with an elephant named Kayla. He tries to show Ted after getting him out of bed, but Ted is late for a meeting.

Mr. Bloomsberry is retiring as head of the museum and says Ted is the only candidate to replace him (and can’t pass the torch onto Junior because he’s working as a cashier at a parking lot),  on condition that he write a presentation on his vision for the museum, to be delivered in one week to the Board of Directors.

Maggie tells Ted that his loved ones need more attention than his career, after which George comes in to show Ted Piccadilly's poster. Ted at first declines, then, agrees to take George to the magic show. When Piccadilly makes Kayla disappear, George goes looking for her and finds her in the basement. They stumble upon the exit and leave the theater. When Piccadilly finds Kayla missing he calls security led by Danno Wolfe, assisted by Mrs. Fisher. Danno is suspicious of Ted and George. At Ted's apartment George and Kayla see TV coverage of Kayla's home with her brother Tonga and sister Layla at an animal park in California.

Ted returns surprised and angry to find George and Kayla in the apartment. Ted attempts to call Piccadilly that Kayla's at his apartment but found out that the theater just closed for the night. So Ted decides to return Kayla personally. On their way back to the theater, George sees an advertisement for the "California Express" train and decides to use it to return Kayla to the animal park. Ted finds them at the train but can't get them out of the boxcar before it leaves the station. Danno thinks George and Ted have kidnapped Kayla. 

Ted really wants to head home and sees St. Louis but the train continues on as usual. As they continued on, George draws on one of his presentation papers which makes Ted yell at him and then snaps that he has to get out but can't reach the boxcar handle. As Ted apologizes to George for yelling at him, George gets help from Kayla to open the boxcar door, but Ted falls out trying to catch the pages of his presentation. At a small train station in Humbleton, Colorado, Ted tries to get the stationmaster to stop the train but the stationmaster denies his request but offered to charge his dead battery cell phone for him while having him to make his call outside. Ted attempts to call Piccadilly and reassure him that Kayla is safe, but doesn't manage to complete the call (because Ted had to get some change from the floorboards and the wires snapped when he reached too far) which makes Danno even more certain he kidnapped Kayla. Ted catches up with the train on the stationmaster's motorcycle. Danno arrives in Humbleton, accidentally makes the stationmaster drop Ted's cell phone, and made him reveal Ted's location of him chasing the California Express.

Ted, George, and Kayla continue on the train until Kayla's movement causes the boxcar to separate from the rest of the train. When it finally stops, they get off and try to find a road heading east. As they attempt to hitchhike, a man in a flatbed truck picks them up. Piccadilly, interviewed by Hark Hanson, reveals pictures of George and Ted as Kayla's kidnappers. Ted realizes they have been heading the wrong way and attempts to head them back east again. They spend the night with Dan, a farmer, and his daughter Anna. Later that day, Ted reads in the newspaper that New York thinks they're kidnappers, and reads about Kayla’s family. Mr. Bloomsberry calls Ted and tells him he’s possibly going to jail. Ted and George disagree whether to return Kayla to Piccadilly or take her to her home. Ted changes his mind the next morning but before they leave for Kayla's home, Danno arrives in a helicopter. A pig throws Danno into a rain barrel and Kayla scares the pilot into flying away. George and company escape in a hollowed-out school bus and arrive at the animal park where Tonga and Layla are happy to see Kayla. Danno turns up again and arrests George and Ted and captures Kayla in a net. 

Flying back to the city, George gets the handcuff keys from Danno and they jump out of the plane by skydiving into New York. They make it back to Piccadilly at the theater and everything is fine, except Danno has followed them. Furious that Danno has think her new friends were kidnappers, Kayla throws him down the trapdoor onto the mattress below. Ms. Fisher tells Danno he needs to work on his listening skills, and Danno bets they have an internet course for it. 

Ted gives his report to the Board of Directors. Initially flustered, he improvises a speech saying that friends are more important than work and makes proposal based on that idea, such as a Father and Son Day. The Board approves his appointment. As the film comes to a close, Ted, Maggie, and George have a picnic with Piccadilly and he reveals a surprise: Tonga and Layla have joined Piccadilly’s act, so Kayla and her family can be together again.

Voice cast

 Frank Welker as Curious George, Duck, Cow
 Jeff Bennett as Ted (The Man with the Yellow Hat)
 Fred Tatasciore as Mr. Bloomsberry
 Nickie Bryar as Maggie, Teenage Boy
 Ed O'Ross as Ivan
 Amy Hill as the Flower Pot Lady, Irate Woman
 Tim Curry as The Great Piccadilly
 Catherine Taber as Tina
 Jamie Kennedy as Mr. Wolfe
 Matt Lauer as Hark Hanson
 Jerry Lewis as The Humbleton Stationmaster
 Cree Summer as Mrs. Fisher, Cargo Pilot, Young Girl
 Jeff McNeal as Kayla, Hog, Tonga & Layla
 Clint Howard as Farmer Dan
 Trupti Potdukhe as Anna
 Phil LaMarr as California Animal Park Attendant
 Carlos Alazraqui as Train Conductor, Newspaper Vendor

Soundtrack
The soundtrack features the hit "California Sun" performed by Brian Wilson as well as all new songs by Carbon Leaf including a re-working of one of their existing songs, "Life Less Ordinary" to fit the theme of the film, a special title track recorded by 429 Records' artist Jackie Greene, and an original score by Heitor Pereira. The soundtrack was released on March 2, 2010.

Track listing
"Life Less Ordinary"Carbon Leaf
"The Friendship Song"Carbon Leaf
"California Sun"Brian Wilson
"On a Roll"Carbon Leaf
"Heart of the Day"Carbon Leaf
"Let Your Troubles Roll By"Carbon Leaf
"Walking in the Sun"Carbon Leaf
"Follow That Monkey"Jackie Greene
"Moon Man"Heitor Pereira
"Going East"Heitor Pereira
"Giving a Hand"Heitor Pereira
"Zoo"Heitor Pereira
"The Friendship Song"Heitor Pereira
"California Sun"Carbon Leaf

Release
The film was released in the United States on March 2, 2010 as a direct-to-video release and received a theatrical release in select countries.

Curious George 2: Follow That Monkey grossed $2.2 million throughout its entire theatrical run in three countries. The film was theatrically released in Sweden, Iceland, and Denmark, with the latter generating the most revenue. The film opened in 50 theaters in Denmark and finished seventh for the weekend, grossing $64,158. The film stayed at ninth for its second and third weekends. The film closed its theatrical run in the country with $1.1 million in box office receipts. In Sweden, the film opened in 47 theaters and finished sixth for the weekend, grossing $59,500. The film did better in its second weekend, adding only one theater and staying at sixth but grossing $122,295 and going up 105.5%. The film closed out its theatrical run in the country with $1 million. In Iceland, the film only opened in three theaters and finished 12th, grossing $1,794 with an average of $598 per theater. The film closed out its run in the country with $12,946.

Reception 
Joly Herman of Common Sense Media awarded the film 4 out of 5 stars, writing, "Cross-country caper with mild peril is OK for preschoolers."

Sequels
A sequel, titled Curious George 3: Back to the Jungle, was released directly to DVD on June 23, 2015. Curious George: Royal Monkey, the fourth film of the series, was released on DVD on September 10, 2019. Curious George:  Go West, Go Wild, the fifth film of the series, was released on Peacock on September 8, 2020. A sixth film, Curious George: Cape Ahoy, was released on Peacock on September 30, 2021.

References

External links

 
 Curious George 2 at The-Numbers.com
 Information on Curious George

2009 direct-to-video films
2009 animated films
2000s American animated films
American children's animated comedy films
Animated films based on children's books
Animated films about elephants
Direct-to-video sequel films
2000s English-language films
Animated films about monkeys
Films scored by Heitor Pereira
Animated films set in New York City
American direct-to-video films
Imagine Entertainment films
Universal Animation Studios animated films
Universal Pictures direct-to-video films
Universal Pictures direct-to-video animated films
2000s children's animated films
Curious George
Films directed by Norton Virgien